Theater in Ukraine (Teatralne mystetsvo Ukrayiny – Theatric Arts of Ukraine) is a form of fine arts and cultural expression using live actor's performance in front of spectators. Ukrainian theater draws on the native traditions, language and culture of Ukraine. The first known records of Ukrainian theater trace back to the early 17th century.

History

Origins 
The origins of Ukrainian theater go back to ancient folk games, dances, songs and Rituals. In the 11th century entertainers known as skomorokhy performed in Ukraine. Also Pre-Christian performance in Ukraine was enriched by a "deep reverence and respect for the Supreme Being."  Medieval and Early Modern

There were elements of theater during church ceremonies, evident from the frescoes of Saint Sophia's Cathedral in Kyiv (eleventh century). The Lviv Brotherhood School and Ostroh Academy were considered important centers for the development of religious drama at that time. 

The first written references to theatrical performances in Ukraine date back to the second decade of the seventeenth century. The performances were brought from the West by Jesuits who were joining the brotherhood schools and other Ukrainian schools. The performances were used on a large scale as Jesuit propaganda. The texts of the plays "Christmas Day proclamation", which was performed in honor of the '' Bishop of Lviv Jeremiah Tisarovsky "(c. 1615 AD) and Jacob Javantovich" (1619 AD) have survived to this day. Records also exist of two Ukrainian plays that were performed, in honor of the death of ''John the Baptist'' on August 29, 1619, near Lviv.

17th to 19th Centuries 
In the 17th and 18th centuries the performance of Nativity scenes and Christmas plays at local events spread. And in the 17th century vertep, portable puppet theaters, became popular.

The first stationary theater in Ukraine was opened in Kharkiv in 1789. In the rest of Ukraine theatrical troupes toured and performed "on the road".

In the early 19th century theaters started to appear  in Kyiv (1806), Odessa (1809), Poltava (1808). In the second half of the 19th century amateur theater became popular. The first Ukrainian professional theater (1864–1924) was the Ruska Besida Theater in Lviv.

20th Century 
Mykola Sadovsky established the first resident theater in Kyiv in 1907. Soon after Ukrainian statehood in 1918 the State Drama Theater was created.

The "Young Theater" (later the theater "Berezil") was created in Kyiv by Les Kurbas and Hnat Yura.  Les Kurbas (who worked as a director, actor, dramaturge and interpreter of world literature) brought the works of William Shakespeare, Henrik Ibsen, Gerhart Hauptmann, Friedrich Schiller and Molière to the Ukrainian stage. With the creation of Berezil theater its stage became a sort of experimental ground. Berezil introduced for the first time the plays of renowned Ukrainian writers and dramaturges Mykola Kulish and Volodymyr Vynnychenko. Les Kurbas was repressed during the Stalinist period but is now viewed as a very important source of inspiration for contemporary Ukrainian artists.  

While the Young Theater was promoting Avant-garde Theater, The State Drama Theater continued traditions of realism. Ivan Kotlyarevsky, who headed the Poltava Theater, was viewed as a founder of classical Ukrainian drama while Hryhoriy Kvitka-Osnovyanenko plays also found widespread acclaim.

Modern 
In 1988, Volodymyr Kuchynskyi and his colleagues formed the Lviv Young Ukrainian Theatre, which they later renamed the Les Kurbas Theatre. The Les Kurbas Theatre has become the premier avant-garde theatre in Ukraine, receiving recognition and state support from the Ukrainian government.

Ukrainian Theater has been increasingly integrated into European culture and there are a number of international theater festivals, which are held in Ukraine every year.

Notable Individuals 
Important Ukrainian playwrights from before 1917 include: Mark Kropyvnytsky (1840–1910), Ivan Tobilevich (1845–1907), Mykhailo Kotsiubynsky (1864–1913), Ivan Franko (1856–1916) and Lesia Ukrayinka (1871–1913). A new era began after the Communist revolution, important writers since include: Mykola Kulish (1892–1962), Ivan Kocherha (1881– 1952), Alexander Korniychuk (1905–1972), and Oles` Honchar (1918).

Many notable 19th century Ukrainian theater luminaries started out in amateur theater such as: Mykhailo Starytsky, Marko Kropyvnytsky and Ivan Karpenko-Karyi. The leading 19th century female star of the Ukrainian was Maria Zankovetska. The renowned theatrical family of Tobilevychi also rose to prominence in the 19th century: Ivan Karpenko-Karyi, Mykola Sadovsky and Panas Saksahansky (stage names) all not only acted and directed but also created their own acting troupes. Their private estate, Khutir Nadia, near Kropyvnytskyi, is a national historic site.

Talented Ukrainian actors who've appeared on the Berezil stage include: Amvrosiy Buchma, Maryan Krushelnytsky, Olimpia Dobrovolska, Oleksandr Serdyuk, Natalya Uzhviy, and Yuriy Shumsky.

Theater Companies 

Theater in Ukraine includes music-drama theaters, theaters of opera and ballet, theaters of operetta, puppet theaters and others. Ten theaters were officially recognized as national. There are more than 120 theatres (state-funded and independent) in Ukraine, and the audience numbers around 5.6 million per year.

Notable theaters include The Dakh Contemporary Arts Center opened in 1994

Books about ''Ukrainian drama and theater'' 
''History of Ukrainian drama''

The book is written by the Ukrainian critic and translator Ivan Stichenko.  It consists of five chapters. It is the first illustrated history of Ukrainian theater. It discusses historical issues, about ''The Development of Theater Art'', and about ''Latin-Slavic folk rituals, Latin-German folk rituals''. Drama and "The Evangelization of Christianity in Ukraine''. The book also gives an analysis of the works of the satirical poet and writer Theophanes Prokopovych''Theater and Drama: A Collection of Critical Essays on Dramatic Theater and Literature'''''

It is a collection of the most important articles of Mykola Kindratovych Voronyi (1871–1938), on the art of theater and theater literature, and what is the work of actors and directors, the nature of the audience, and, what are the ways that may contribute to the development of theater in the future.

See also
 Gogolfest
 List of theatres in Ukraine
 Theatre of Coryphaei

 References 

 Bibliography 
Larissa M. L. Onyshkevych. „Ukrainian Theater.” In Ethnic Theater in America, 525-48. Ed. Maxine Schwartz Seller. Westport, Conn.: Greenwood Press, 1982. Reprinted as “Ukrainian American Theatre”, in The Ukrainian Heritage in America. Ed. W. Dushnyk. New York, Ukr. Coord.Com. in the U.S., 1991, 221-229.

Larissa M. L. Onyshkevych. “Toronto’s Avant-Guard Ukrainian Theatre”. The Ukrainian Weekly.  April 17, 1986. 9, 15. 

Larissa M. L. Zaleska Onyshkevych. "Volodymyr Kuchynsky’s ‘Les Kurbas Theatre’ from Lviv.” Slavic & East European Performance. 15(422), 2, 1996, 68—73.

Larissa M. L. Onyshkevych. “Inspector General from Kyiv on Stage in Philadelphia”, Slavic and East European Performance. 25, 2, spring 2005, 80-84.

Larissa M. L.  Onyshkevych. “’White Butterflies, Plaited Chains: A Live Metamorphosis by Theatre-in-a-Basket from Lviv, Ukraine.” Slavic & East European Performance. 26, 1, 2006, 84—90.

Larissa M. L. Zaleska Onyshkevych. “Echoes of Chornobyl at the LaMama Theater”. The Ukrainian Weekly. Feb. 16, 1992, 10, 18.

Larissa M. L.  Onyshkevych. “The Kurbas Theatre’s Productions of Marusia Churai and Kaminnyi Hospodar [in Lviv]. The Ukrainian Weekly, March 22, 1988, 10,13.

Larissa M. L.  Onyshkevych. “On the Stages of Ukraine in 1990: From Sholom Aleichem to Mykola Kulish.” Slavic and East European Performance, 11, no.1 (1991): 49-57.

Irena R. Makaryk. About the Harrowing of Hell. A 17th Century Ukrainian Play in its European Context. (Dovehouse, 1989)''

External links 
 Ministry of Foreign Affairs of Ukraine
 Dmytro Antonovych. Ukrainian Theater
 الأدب الأوكرانى

Theaters' website from Ukraine
 Ukrainian theatrical world
 teatre.com.ua
 Magazine «Cinema-Theater»

 
Ukrainian culture